On Wings of Song: The Performance Recordings of Josephine A. Estill 1939–1974 is a compilation album on four CDs featuring performances by Jo Estill. The album is taken from original live recordings by Charles M. "Bud" Edmonds of Colorado Springs, Colorado, United States. The album was remastered at Banquet Studios, Sebastopol, California, United States during 2008–2009, with sound engineer Darryl Webb and produced by Alice Estill Miller. The album sleeve notes credit special thanks to Zana Timroth, Donald P. Jenkins, Kim Steinhauer and Steven Chicurel.

Track listing
Disk 1 (The Early Years 1939–1950)

Disk 2 (Classical Repertoire 1960–1969)

Disk 3 (Religious Repertoire 1970–1974)

Disk 4 (Opera 1970–1974 & Comments 2007)

References

2009 albums